Dragon boat (traditional boat race) at the 2018 Asian Games was held in Palembang, Indonesia from 25 to 27 August 2018 as a part of the canoeing competition. All events were held at Jakabaring Lake.

Schedule

Medalists

Men

Women

Medal table

Participating nations
A total of 341 athletes from 11 nations competed in dragon boat at the 2018 Asian Games:

References

External links
 2018 Asian Games Official Website
Official Result Book – Canoe/Kayak Sprint and TBR

 
2018 Asian Games events
2018